Siri Aurdal (born 20 October 1937 in Oslo) is a Norwegian painter, graphic designer, and sculptor. She comes from an artistic family with parents textile artist Synnøve Anker Aurdal and painter Leon Aurdal. Ludvig Eikaas was her stepfather from 1959.

Although Aurdal is both a graphic designer and painter, her main field was sculpture and work with sculpture. She made her debut at the Høstutstillingen 1961 with a bust of Egil Eggen in brass. After that, she made a number of other busts of famous people, including Earle Hyman (1963) and Svend von Düring and Ludvig Eikaas (1965).

In February 1969, she won a competition to decorate schools in Oslo, and in October 1972 presented the sculpture "Havbølger" at Trosterud skole. It was 12 × 6 m glass fibre tubes cut in wavy shapes which serves as a play sculpture for 100 children.

In 1979, she made a large relief in aluminium for Abelhaugen train station in Oslo.

Notable exhibitions 
 2016 Bølger i parken rekomponert, Vigelandsparken, Oslo
 1980 Begrensninger dialog, at Vigelandsmuseet, Oslo.
 1969 Omgivelser, Kunstnernes Hus, Oslo
 1968 Galleri Kringla, Oslo
1966 Kunstforeningen, Oslo

Collaborative exhibitions 
 2016 Aurdal/Mugaas, Kunstnernes Hus, Oslo
 1974 Tre generasjoner, Kunstindustrimuseet, Oslo

Collaborative exhibitions 
 2017 The Nordic Pavilion at the Venice Biennale : Mirrored
 2016 Inauguration of new space, Galleri Riis, Oslo
 2015 Pop Etc.! Norsk popkunst 1964–1974, Henie Onstad Kunstsenter, Bærum, Norway.
 2013 Hold stenhårdt fast på greia di, Kunsthall Oslo, Oslo
 1979 The 15th Biennial, Antwerpen, Belgium
 1973 Arkitektonisk miljø, Galleri F15, Moss
 1972 Norsk skulptur, Nordjyllands Museum, Aalborg, Denmark
 1972 Synspunkter, Kunstnernes Hus, Oslo
 1971 Synpunkter, Arkiv för dekorativ konst, Lund, Sweden
 1968 The Nordic Youth Biennial, Helsinki, Finland
 1961–1963 Høstutstillingen, Kunstnernes Hus, Oslo

References

External links 

Norwegian sculptors
Norwegian women sculptors
Norwegian artists
1937 births
Living people